Legg's Dependence, also known as Long Creek Farm and William E. Porter Farm, is a historic home located at Stevensville, Queen Anne's County, Maryland.  It is a -story center-hall plan brick house.  It was built in several stages beginning around 1760–80, as a single-story hall/parlor plan dwelling.  It was enlarged to its present form during the second quarter of the 19th century.

The estate at one point was home to an enslaved husband and wife, Sling and Sarah Louis, who were sold through a trader in Richmond, Virginia to the owner of a plantation near Ashbie's Gap in Virginia. One or both of Sling and Sarah's parents later escaped with the help of Harriet Tubman and found their way to Philadelphia.

It was listed on the National Register of Historic Places in 2003.

References

External links
, including photo from 2002, at Maryland Historical Trust

Hall and parlor houses
Houses on the National Register of Historic Places in Maryland
Houses in Queen Anne's County, Maryland
Georgian architecture in Maryland
Greek Revival houses in Maryland
Houses completed in 1760
Kent Island, Maryland
National Register of Historic Places in Queen Anne's County, Maryland